José Arturo Santos Reyes (born 28 December 1985) is a Mexican professional boxer. As an amateur, he won a silver medal at the 2004 Junior World Championships at flyweight and later competed at the 2008 Summer Olympics at featherweight.

Amateur career
At the 2004 Junior World Championships he beat Zorigtbaataryn Enkhzorig but lost the 2004 final to Ilhom Rahimov from Uzbekistan.

At the 2006 Central American and Caribbean Games he won silver at bantamweight beating Héctor Manzanilla but losing to Guillermo Rigondeaux.

At the 2007 World Championships he reached the quarterfinal where he lost to Vasyl Lomachenko but qualified for Beijing.

He is participating in the Beijing 2008 Olympics where he beat Nick Okoth and Alaa Shili to reach the quarter finals.

External links
sports-reference

1985 births
Featherweight boxers
Boxers at the 2008 Summer Olympics
Olympic boxers of Mexico
Living people
Boxers from Tamaulipas
Sportspeople from Nuevo Laredo
Mexican male boxers
Central American and Caribbean Games silver medalists for Mexico
Competitors at the 2006 Central American and Caribbean Games
Central American and Caribbean Games medalists in boxing